Ruby Tuesday may refer to:
 "Ruby Tuesday" (song), a 1967 song by the Rolling Stones
 Ruby Tuesday (restaurant), American multinational foodservice retailer and franchise